Brownberry may refer to:

 Brownberry (bakery), old fashioned bakery now owned by Bimbo Bakeries USA. 
 Brownberry, a wolfrider in the science fiction/fantasy comic book series Elfquest.
 Brownberry Farm, one of the Ancient Tenements on Dartmoor, England.
 Brown berry, a rare tomato cultivar.